Klamath Falls is a city in, and the county seat of, Klamath County, Oregon, United States. The city was originally called Linkville when George Nurse founded the town in 1867. It was named after the Link River, on whose falls the city was sited. The name was changed to Klamath Falls in 1893. The population was 21,813 at the 2020 census.

Logging was Klamath Falls's first major industry.

Etymology
At its founding in 1867, Klamath Falls was named Linkville. The name was changed to Klamath Falls in 1892–93. The name Klamath , may be a variation of the descriptive native for "people" [in Chinookan] used by the indigenous peoples of the Northwest Plateau to refer to the region. Several locatives derived from the Modoc or Achomawi: lutuami, lit: "lake dwellers", móatakni, "tule lake dwellers", respectively, could have also led to spelling variations that ultimately made the word what it is today. No evidence suggests that the name is of Klamath origin. The Klamath themselves called the region Yulalona or Iwauna, which referred to the phenomenon of the Link River flowing upstream when the south wind blew hard.

The Klamath name for the Link River white water falls was Tiwishkeni, or "where the falling waters rush". From this Link River white water phenomenon "Falls" was added to Klamath in its name. In reality it is best described as rapids rather than falls. The rapids are visible a short distance below the Link River Dam, where the water flow is generally insufficient to provide water flow over the river rocks.

History

The Klamath and Modoc peoples were the first known inhabitants of the area. This led to the Modoc War of 1872–1873, which was a hugely expensive campaign for the US Cavalry, costing an estimated $500,000, the equivalent of over $8 million in 2000. 17 Indigenous people and 83 whites were killed.

The Applegate Trail, which passes through the lower Klamath area, was blazed in 1846 from west to east in an attempt to provide a safer route for emigrants on the Oregon Trail. The first non-Indigenous colonizer is considered to have been Wallace Baldwin, a 19-year-old civilian who drove fifty head of horses in the valley in 1852. In 1867, George Nurse, named the small settlement "Linkville", because of Link River north of Lake Ewauna.

The Klamath Reclamation Project began in 1906 to drain marshland and move water to allow for agriculture. With the building of the main "A" Canal, water was first made available on May 22, 1907. Veterans of World War I and World War II were given homesteading opportunities on the reclaimed land.

During World War II, a Japanese-American internment camp, the Tule Lake War Relocation Center, was located in nearby Newell, California, and a satellite of the Camp White, Oregon, POW camp was located just on the Oregon-California border near the town of Tulelake, California. This is said to be the only Japanese-inflicted casualty on the US mainland during the war.

Timber harvesting through the use of railroad was extensive in Klamath County for the first few decades of the 20th century. With the arrival of the Southern Pacific Transportation Company in 1909, Klamath Falls grew quickly from a few hundred to several thousand. Dozens of lumber mills cut fir and pine lumber, and the industry flourished until the late 1980s when the northern spotted owl and other endangered species were driving forces in changing western forest policy.

On September 20, 1993, a series of earthquakes struck near Klamath Falls. Many downtown buildings, including the county courthouse and the former Sacred Heart Academy and Convent, were damaged or destroyed, and two people were killed.

Water rights controversy

The city made national headlines in 2001 when a court decision was made to shut off Klamath Project irrigation water on April 6 because of Endangered Species Act requirements. The Lost River sucker and shortnose sucker were listed on the Federal Endangered Species List in 1988, and when drought struck in 2001, a panel of scientists stated that further diversion of water for agriculture would be detrimental to these species, which reside in the Upper Klamath Lake, as well as to the protected Coho salmon which spawn in the Klamath River. Many protests by farmers and citizens culminated in a "Bucket Brigade" on Main Street May 7, 2001, in Klamath Falls. The event was attended by 18,000 farmers, ranchers, citizens, and politicians. Two giant bucket monuments have since been constructed and erected in town to commemorate the event. Such universal criticism resulted in a new plan implemented in early 2002 to resume irrigation to farmers.

Low river flows in the Klamath and Trinity rivers and high temperatures led to a mass die-off of at least 33,000 salmon in 2002. Dwindling salmon numbers have practically shut down the fishing industry in the region and caused over $60m in disaster aid being given to fishermen to offset losses. 90% of Trinity River water is diverted for California agriculture. As much as 90% of the Trinity's water, which would otherwise flow into the Klamath and out to sea, instead rushes south toward California's thirsty center.

According to a National Academy of Sciences report of October 22, 2003, limiting irrigation water did little if anything to help endangered fish and may have hurt the populations. A contrary report has criticized the National Academy of Sciences report. The Chiloquin Dam has been removed to help improve sucker spawning habitat.

In 2021 tensions between locals and the Federal Government led to two local farmers to purchase land at the headgates in Klamath Falls, OR. These farmers have ties to the Ammon Bundy People's Rights organization and are preparing for a potential standoff situation with the government.

Geothermal heating
Klamath Falls is located in a known geothermal resource area. Geothermal power has been used directly for geothermal heating in the area since the early 1900s. A downtown district heating system was constructed in 1981 and extended in 1982. There was public opposition to the scheme. Many homes were heated by private geothermal wells, and owners were concerned that the city system could lower the water level and/or reduce water temperatures. System operation was delayed until 1984 following an aquifer study. Full operational testing showed no negative impact on the private wells. The system was shut down again in 1986 after multiple distribution piping failures were discovered. By 1991, the distribution piping had been reconstructed, and the system was again operating. The system has been expanded since then, and according to the Oregon Institute of Technology, the operation is "at or near operational break-even". The system is used to provide direct heat for homes, city schools, greenhouses, government and commercial buildings, geothermally heated snowmelt systems for sidewalks and roads, and process heat for the wastewater treatment plant.

Air quality
According to the Oregon Department of Environmental Quality (DEQ) significant efforts are being made to improve the air quality in the Klamath Basin. The following excerpts are from a report produced by DEQ in September 2012.

Because of topography, weather and a large number of woodstoves, the Klamath Falls area has a long history of identifying problems with particulate pollutions and working to solve them. With increased understanding of the health effects of particulates, EPA has made the standards more protective over time, addressing smaller sized particles that are the most hazardous but more difficult to control. Since 1994, the Klamath Falls area has attained the larger or coarse (PM10) particulate matter standard. In 2009, with the adoption of a fine particulate (PM2.5) matter standard, EPA changed the legal status of the Klamath Falls Area from attainment (meeting air quality standards) to nonattainment (not meeting air quality standards) for fine particulate matter (PM2.5). DEQ has adopted an attainment plan with associated regulations to ensure that the Klamath Falls area meets the current PM2.5 standard."

In November 2007, Klamath County revised its Clean Air Ordinance to implement early particulate reductions, including:
 Revising woodstove curtailment levels to restrict wood burning when weather conditions could lead to accumulation of particulate in the Klamath Falls area
 Requiring removal of an uncertified woodstove upon sale of a home
 Prohibiting the use of burn barrels
 Tightening enforcement of wood stove curtailment
 A series of woodstove change-out efforts funded by the City of Klamath Falls, EPA and the American Recovery and Reinvestment Act of 2009 resulted in replacement of 584 woodstoves and significant emission reductions between 2008 and 2011."

Geography

Klamath Falls has a high desert landscape. The older part of the city is located above natural geothermal springs. These have been used for the heating of homes and streets, primarily in the downtown area.

Climate
Klamath Falls is known as "Oregon's City of Sunshine" because the area enjoys 300 days of sun per year. The Klamath Falls area is a high desert and features a climate with cold, snowy winters along with hot summer afternoons and cool summer nights. Under the Köppen climate classification the city's climate type is Csb, often described as warm summer Mediterranean. Using the  isotherm preferred by some climatologists, Klamath Falls is a Dsb climate, often described as warm summer humid continental.

Typical of its region, Klamath Falls has a dry season in summertime, with the greatest precipitation occurring in wintertime, a substantial proportion falling as snow. The maximum snow depth has been  on January 3, 1901.

The freeze-free season averages around 120 days, with the first freeze in a typical year being on September 21, and the last freeze being on June 1.

Demographics

2010 census

As of the census of 2010, there were 20,840 people, 8,542 households and 4,876 families residing in the city. The immediate neighboring Census Designated Place of Altamont, Oregon had a population of 19,257. The racial makeup of the city was 83.4% White, 1.0% African American, 4.3% Native American, 1.6% Asian, 0.1% Pacific Islander, 4.5% from other races, and 5.0% from two or more races. Hispanic or Latino of any race were 11.8% of the population.

There were 8,542 households, of which 30.4% had children under the age of 18 living with them, 38.5% were married couples living together, 13.0% had a female householder with no husband present, 5.6% had a male householder with no wife present, and 42.9% were non-families. 32.9% of all households were made up of individuals, and 11.3% had someone living alone who was 65 years of age or older. The average household size was 2.35 and the average family size was 2.98.

The median age in the city was 33.6 years. 23.6% of residents were under the age of 18; 14.6% were between the ages of 18 and 24; 25.2% were from 25 to 44; 24.1% were from 45 to 64; and 12.3% were 65 years of age or older. The gender makeup of the city was 49.3% male and 50.7% female.

2000 census
As of the census of 2000, there were 19,462 people, 7,916 households, and 4,670 families residing in the city.

The racial makeup of the city was:
 85.12% White
 1.02% African American
 4.44% Native American
 1.32% Asian
 0.13% Pacific Islander
 4.15% from other races
 3.83% from two or more races

9.32% of the population are Hispanic or Latino of any race.

There were 7,916 households, out of which:
 30.0% had children under the age of 18 living with them
 42.2% were married couples living together
 11.7% had a female householder with no husband present
 41.0% were non-families
 32.4% of all households were made up of individuals
 11.9% had someone living alone who was 65 years of age or older

The average household size was 2.36 and the average family size was 2.99.

The age distribution was:
 25.5% under the age of 18
 13.1% from 18 to 24
 27.2% from 25 to 44
 21.5% from 45 to 64
 12.8% who were 65 years of age or older

The median age was 33 years. For every 100 females, there were 101.9 males. For every 100 females age 18 and over, there were 100.1 males.

The median income for a household in the city was $28,498, and the median income for a family was $37,021. Males had a median income of $31,567 versus $22,313 for females. The per capita income for the city was $16,710. About 21.9% of the population and 16.2% of families were below the poverty line, including 26.8% of those under age 18 and 9.5% of those 65 or over.

Government and politics

Klamath Falls is a home rule municipality under the Oregon Constitution, and has been governed by a council–manager form of government since its citizens voted to adopt the current charter in 1972. The city council, which is nonpartisan, has five members, each elected from one of the five wards. They serve four-year terms, which are staggered so that either two or three seats are up for election every two years. The mayor, who is nonpartisan and serves a term of four years, presides over all city council meetings. This official appoints committees, can veto any ordinance not passed with the affirmative vote of at least four council members, and casts tie-breaking votes. The city manager, however, is the administrative head of the city. This official is appointed by the council and serves an indefinite term at the council's pleasure. The municipal judge and the city attorney are appointed on the same basis. Todd Kellstrom was mayor from 1992 to 2016. Carol Westfall is the current mayor, having beaten Kellstrom in the 2016 election. Jonathan Teichert is the current city manager.

For the purpose of representation in the state legislature, Klamath Falls is located in the 28th Senate district, represented by Republican Dennis Linthicum, and in the 56th House district, represented by Republican E. Werner Reschke. Federally, Klamath Falls is located in Oregon's 2nd congressional district, which has a Cook Partisan Voting Index of R+10
and is represented by Republican Cliff Bentz.

Economy
Sky Lakes Medical Center is the largest employer in the area, followed by the Klamath County School District Other major employers are JELD-WEN, Collins Products, Columbia Forest Products, iQor, Klamath Falls City School District and the Oregon Institute of Technology.

Military airbase
Kingsley Field Air National Guard Base, also known as Crater Lake–Klamath Regional Airport, was established in 1928. It is home to the  270th Air Traffic Control Squadron - 173rd Fighter Wing of the Oregon Air National Guard, stationed at Kingsley Field airbase. The squadron currently flies F-15 C/D Variants. It has the second largest runway in Oregon ( wide) and was listed as a backup landing strip for the Space Shuttle. It is normal to hear the aircraft throughout Klamath Falls during daylight hours.

Education

Colleges and universities
 Oregon Institute of Technology
 Klamath Community College
 College of Cosmetology

Public schools
Klamath Falls and the surrounding area are served by Klamath County School District and the Klamath Falls City School District.

Recreation

Klamath Falls is home to many outdoor winter and summer activities. The nearby Running Y Ranch Resort & hotel features a golf course designed by Arnold Palmer and an ice skating arena. The resort overlooks Upper Klamath Lake. There is also a canoe trail through the wildlife refuge at Rocky Point.

With the help of a number of community members, Klamath Falls has developed a series of trails in Moore Park. The trail network in and around Moore Park is used by hikers, cyclists, runners, and others. Users have spent time developing and improving the trails which offer varied terrain and vegetation, views of Upper Klamath Lake and the Klamath Basin, and a range of difficulty levels.

The OC&E Woods Line State Trail is a rail trail in the city and is the longest state park in Oregon. Wiard Park, along the OC&E State Trail and operated by the Wiard Memorial Park and Recreation District, is open dawn to dusk from May 1 to October 1. Klamath Falls has a Veterans Memorial Park located downtown along the shore of Lake Ewauna.

Klamath Falls is located on the Pacific Flyway, and large numbers of waterfowl and raptors are seen throughout the year.

Winter cross country skiing and snowshoeing in the park is also popular. The more-than-mile-high Crater Lake Marathon is an annual event.

The Lava Beds provide an opportunity to explore an area that has perhaps the highest concentration of lava tubes. The monument also interprets the Modoc War, including the First Battle of the Stronghold.

Mountain Lakes Wilderness Area, one of the first designated wilderness areas in the United States, lies just to the west of Klamath Falls, providing opportunities for backpacking and fishing in its mountain lakes.

Transportation

Amtrak, the national passenger rail system, serves Klamath Falls station, located on a route originally built by the Southern Pacific Railroad – operating its Coast Starlight daily in both directions between Seattle, Washington and Los Angeles, California.

Fixed-route public transit service is operated by Basin Transit Service, a special service district with an elected board. Oregon POINT connects Klamath Falls with Medford and Brookings, Oregon. Sage Stage provides weekly service to Alturas, California.

Notable people

Sharron Angle (born 1949), Nevada politician
Brenda Bakke (born 1963), actress
Dennis Bennett (1939–2012), Major League Baseball player
Harry D. Boivin (1904–1999), speaker of the Oregon House of Representatives and two-time president of the Oregon Senate
Ernest C. Brace (1931–2014), pilot
Jeff Bronkey (born 1965), Major League Baseball player
Seth Brown (born 1992), Major League Baseball player for the Oakland Athletics
Don Pedro Colley (1938–2017), actor
Ian Dobson (born 1982), Team Run Eugene coach, former Olympic coach for Greek Olympian Alexi Pappas, and retired Olympic 5k runner
Christine Drazan (born 1972), minority leader of the Oregon House of Representatives and Republican nominee for governor in 2022
Chris Eyre (born 1968), Sundance Film Festival award winner
Helen J. Frye (1930–2011), Federal District Court judge
Chad Gray (born 1971), musician
Rosie Hamlin (1945–2017), singer-songwriter
Ralph Hill (1908–1994), Olympic 5000 meters silver medalist
James Ivory (born 1928), Oscar-winning director, screenwriter and producer
Charles S. Moore (1857–1915), Oregon politician
Dan O'Brien (born  1966), Olympic gold medalist in Decathlon
Charles O. Porter (1919–2006), Oregon politician
Marty Ravellette (1939–2007), armless hero who lived in Klamath Falls in the 1960s
Laurenne Ross (born 1988), World Cup alpine ski racer
Janice Romary (1927–2007), U.S. women's Olympic foilist who was the first woman to appear at six Olympic Games
Kim Walker-Smith (born 1981), neopentecostal worship leader and recording artist
Paul Zahniser (1896–1964), Major League Baseball player

Sister city
Klamath Falls has one sister city, as designated by Sister Cities International:

 Rotorua, New Zealand

In popular culture 

 Klamath Falls appears in the 1998 video game Fallout 2, produced by Black Isle Studios. In the game it has come to be known as simply Klamath, and is an important commercial center for the tribal villages of southern Oregon and northern California. It is also a center for agriculture and the hunting of oversized, mutated geckos. However, as with most localities in the Wasteland, it is a deprived and impoverished town where gang violence and prostitution are rife, and is additionally plagued by a swarm of rats occupying the sewers.

Radio stations

FM stations 
MADFM
88.5 FM - KLMF JPR classics & news service
88.9 FM - KJKF	Contemporary Christian Music K-LOVE
89.5 FM - KTEC College Freeform Oregon Institute of Technology
89.9 FM - K210BY Christian
90.5 FM - K213AI Jefferson Public Radio news & information service
90.9 FM - KSKF Jefferson Public Radio rhythm & news service
91.5 FM - K218EX Spanish Christian
91.9 FM - K220BJ Jefferson Public Radio news & information service
92.5 FM - KLAD-FM Country
92.9 FM -	K225CW News/Talk
93.3 FM - 	K227CU Rock
94.9 FM - KAGO-FM Rock
96.5 FM - KFLS-FM Country Tulelake
97.1 FM - K246BB Christian Keno
97.5 FM - KYSF Christian Worship Music Air 1 Bonanza
98.5 FM - KHIC Top 40 Keno
99.5 FM - KFXX-FM Classic Hits
99.9 FM - K260AK Christian
100.7 FM - KLKF Contemporary Christian Music  K-LOVE Malin
101.3 FM - K267CF Christian 
102.5 FM - K273DF News/Talk
104.3 FM - K282CB Sports
104.7 FM - KFEG Classic Rock
105.5 FM - KKKJ Top 40 Merrill
106.5 FM - K293CQ Sports Altamont 
106.9 FM - KKRB Adult Contemporary

AM stations 
960 AM - KLAD Sports
1150 AM - KAGO News/Talk
1240 AM - KRJW Sports
1450 AM - KFLS News/Talk

Television stations

See also

Bibliography

References

External links

 
 Where are the falls? (flyer prepared by the Klamath County Museum, August 2008)
 Entry for Klamath Falls in the Oregon Blue Book
 Basin Transit Service

 
Cities in Oregon
County seats in Oregon
Micropolitan areas of Oregon
Populated places established in 1867
Cities in Klamath County, Oregon
1867 establishments in Oregon